Izzat Nagar is a suburb close to the IT hub of Hyderabad, India.

Commercial area

Transport
It is connected by buses run by TSRTC.

The closest MMTS train station is at HITEC city.
Landmark beside Hyundai research and development center Hyundai,R&D.

See also
Madhapur
Kukatpally
Bachupally
Mallampet
Bowrampet

Neighbourhoods in Hyderabad, India